Unconventional myosin-Va is a motor protein in charge of the intracellular transport of vesicles, organelles and protein complexes along the actin filaments. In humans it is coded for by the MYO5A gene.

Structure 
In the presence of cargo adapters and calcium, unconventional myosin Va is present in an elongated and active state. It has an N-terminal head domain and a C-terminal tail domain. The actin-binding head (N-Terminal) is an ATP-dependent motor domain that transmits changes from the active site to the light chain lever arm. The C-terminal globular domain (GB) decides the Myosin class and moderate the cargo transport. Also, the GB interacts with other cargo specific proteins. Myosin Va is highly expressed in neurons and melanocytes.

Interactions 

MYO5A has been shown to interact with DYNLL1, RAB27A, DYNLL2, RPGRIP1L, Rab3A and miR-145.

Clinical significance

 Defects in Myosin Va are associated with Griscelli syndrome type 1, also known as Elejalde syndrome a rare autosomal recessive disorder. This defect is due a mutation in which a premature stop codon in the globular tail disrupt melanosome transport producing partial albinism. Griscelli syndrome type 1 can present with pigment defects and neurological disorders such as, hypotonia, motor development delay and mental impairment.
 Myosin Va is highly expressed in the nervous system and it is present in almost the entire brain. MY5A perform an important role in the regulation of axonal vesicle transport on the neurofilaments. The GB of MYO5A can form a complex with Rab3A. The involvement of this complex is important for the synaptic vesicles (SVs) trafficking of neurotransmitters and the dynamics of the SVs on the actin filaments. The absence of MYO5A in the brain can be associated with loco motor dysfunction and neuroendocrine abnormalities. As mention MYO5A is highly expressed on the neurons. Therefore, a mutation on MYO5A can be related with abnormal neuronal development and the progression of neurodegeneration.
 MYO5A and MYO5B are involved with Kv1.5 (encoded by Potassium voltage-gated channel subfamily A member 5, KCNA5) in the myocytes. Kv1.5 is associated with the regulation of the action potential in the myocytes. New strategies targeting Kv1.5 current through MYO5A and MYO5B in human atrial fibrillation (AF) are being studied.
 Over expression of MYO5A, it has also been seen to be related to cancer metastasis. MYO5A can be highly expressed on metastatic colorectal cancer tissues and neck lymph node metastasis of oral squamous cell carcinoma. Also, MYO5A can be a predictor marker on neck lymph node metastasis and be helpful in patient prognosis.

In non-primate mammals

Model organisms have been used in the study of MYO5A function. A conditional knockout mouse line, called Myo5atm1e(KOMP)Wtsi was generated as part of the International Knockout Mouse Consortium program—a high-throughput mutagenesis project to generate and distribute animal models of disease to interested scientists.

Male and female animals underwent a standardized phenotypic screen to determine the effects of deletion. Twenty five tests were carried out on mutant mice and three significant abnormalities were observed. Male homozygous mutants had abnormal hair cycles, coat colouration and an increased susceptibility to bacterial infection.

Mutations in this gene cause a form of Griscelli syndrome in horses known as "Lavender Foal Syndrome"

See also 
 Myosin
MYP5B

References

Further reading

External links 
 

Genes mutated in mice